Karl Lindberg (May 14, 1906 – May 23, 1988) was a Swedish cross-country skier who competed in the early 1930s. At the 1931 FIS Nordic World Ski Championships, Lindberg earned a bronze in the 50 km.

Cross-country skiing results
All results are sourced from the International Ski Federation (FIS).

World Championships
 1 medal – (1 bronze)

References

External links

Swedish male cross-country skiers
FIS Nordic World Ski Championships medalists in cross-country skiing

1906 births
1998 deaths